Wonder Project J is a 1994 life simulation video game developed by Almanic Corporation and published by Enix for the Super Famicom. In the game, players take care of a boy Gijin (robot) created by Dr. Geppetto named Pino. Directed by Takashi Yoneda, the title was created by most of the same personnel that worked on previous projects at Almanic such as E.V.O.: Search for Eden. It was met with positive reception from critics and sold over 1.3 million copies in Japan, making it one of the best-selling Super Famicom games. A sequel, Wonder Project J2, was released in 1996 for the Nintendo 64.

Gameplay 

Wonder Project J is a life simulation game in which the player raises a Pinocchio-esque boy named Pino, who displays a very large amount of animations to make him appear more human to the player. The game uses Pino's fairy companion Tinker as a point and click interface like an adventure game, with the main goal being educate Pino to attempt making him more human, which can be accomplished by scolding him when he does something wrong and praising him when he does something right. The player collect a variety of items through the adventure, which can be used for certain purposes. Pino needs to succeed in various challenges and confrontations to activate virtue circuits, with his final task to foster relations between humans and the robot-like Gijin. Certain actions also reduces Pino's health, which is restored with repairs at the cost of money.

Synopsis

Development and release 
Wonder Project J was developed by Almanic Corporation, which also developed E.V.O.: Search for Eden, in conjunction with Mint and Omnibus Promotion. Takashi Yoneda served as the project's director, as well as designer and writer. Hiroki Fujimoto also served as producer. Yoneda recalled on his personal website that he had a difficult time understanding the concept of communicating with a character via a point and click interface, however he succeeded in realizing the game due to cooperation with late anime director Umanosuke Iida. Yoneda stated he used both Sekai Meisaku Gekijō and works from Toei Animation as models for world building. Yoneda has since regarded the title as "the most thoughtful and deep work" for him. Japanese animator Toshihiro Kawamoto also worked as artist for the game and also illustrated the cover art.

Wonder Project J was first released for the Super Famicom by Enix in Japan on 4 December 1994. An official strategy guide was also released in Japan by Enix. Despite never being officially published outside Japan, a fan translation was released in 2001.

Reception 

In April 1995, Famitsus "Reader Cross Review" section gave Wonder Project J a 7 out of 10. The game was a commercial hit, with sales of 1.3 million units in Japan alone. Hardcore Gamer gave the title a positive retrospective outlook. In 2011, 1UP.coms Bob Mackey listed it among the "Six Must-Play Super Nintendo Imports".

Sequel 
A sequel, Wonder Project J2, was developed by Givro Corporation (previously Almanic Corp.) and released by Enix for the Nintendo 64 in 1996, serving as one of the last projects by Givro prior to their dissolution in 1998. The sequel was later re-released by Square Enix as a two-part download for mobile phones in Japan in 2010.

Notes

References

External links 
 Wonder Project J at GameFAQs
 Wonder Project J at Giant Bomb
 Wonder Project J at MobyGames

1994 video games
Enix games
Givro Corporation games
Japan-exclusive video games
Raising sims
Square Enix franchises
Super Nintendo Entertainment System games
Super Nintendo Entertainment System-only games
Video games about robots
Video games developed in Japan
Video games featuring non-playable protagonists
Video games scored by Akihiko Mori